Lurid Land is a 1997 puzzle-platform game developed by Illusion Softworks.

Plot
A country has been overtaken by an evil wizard. The player takes the role of one of two wizards who set out on a journey to defeat the villain and free the country.

Gameplay
Each of the time-limited levels sees the player aim to save all prisoners and open doors to the next level. In addition, the player has to avoid enemies that try to catch them. Various mechanisms such as ladders are able to be manipulated in order to complete each of the 60 levels, which are set in different environments such as a castle, forest, or cave. While predominantly a single-player title, the game can also be played in cooperative or competitive multiplayer.

Reception
Lukáš Erben of Score magazine gave Lurid Land 70%. He praised the gameplay and technical execution, while criticizing multiplayer. Meanwhile, Riki magazine also gave the title 70%, praising the gameplay and music, while critical of its 2D graphics. The reviewer ultimately deemed Lurid Land the best Czech-Slovak puzzle game.

References 

1997 video games
DOS games
Windows games
Puzzle-platform games
Video games developed in the Czech Republic
Cooperative video games
Multiplayer and single-player video games